Marquee, or CBC Marquee, was a Canadian drama television series which aired on CBC Television from 1979 to 1980.

Premise
Each episode of this series featured a different adventure drama, including the pilot for The Phoenix Team which was broadcast as a series later in 1980. Productions reflected various regions throughout Canada.

Scheduling
This hour-long series was broadcast on Sundays at 9:00 p.m. (Eastern) form 6 January to 17 February 1980.

Episodes included:

 "Kilroy Was Here" (Brian Walker producer; René Bonnière director; Tony Sheer writer)
 "Northern Lights" (Ronald Weyman producer; Martin Lavut director; Arnie Gelbart writer)
 "Paid Vacation" (Vivienne Leebosh producer; Ralph Thomas writer and director)
 "The Phoenix Team", starring Don Francks and Frances Hyland
 "Toronto Jam" (Jack Nixon-Browne producer; Stephen Katz director; Rob Forsyth writer)

References

External links
 

CBC Television original programming
1979 Canadian television series debuts
1980 Canadian television series endings
1970s Canadian drama television series
1980s Canadian drama television series